Vilnius Lyceum is a secondary state school situated in Vilnius, Lithuania.

Founded in 1990, Vilnius Lyceum is a state coeducational day school enrolling students in Grades 9 to 12. The total number of students is 609, including 75 students in the International Baccalaureate section.

Tuition is provided in both Lithuanian (national curriculum) and English (International Baccalaureate).

Vilnius Lyceum is a modern, receptive to innovation educational establishment with a dynamic, creative, open-minded community ready to accept academic challenges and act with integrity and honesty. The school aims to provide stimulating environment for talented and highly motivated students so that they can pursue quality education, develop and manifest their individual skills and abilities, maintain communication based on democratic values, and increase their civic, cultural, patriotic and international awareness.

History 
An idea of a new type of school for the academically gifted children was conceived in 1990 and implemented in the Center of Students' Creativity and Polytechnical Education. The creators of such idea - Principal Eugenijus Abramovas and Vice-Principal Birutė Bartaškaitė - invited students who were interested in natural sciences and mathematics to Year 10 (Junior year). There being no admissions exams (entrance exams were instated in 1991), the students were selected based on their academic achievements from the previous year and a personal interview. Three small classes were formed after this process. Another class was formed for students who studied in Russian. The principal made Giedrius Zlatkus the supervisor of all classes. At that time most new education principles were introduced: an exam after every semester, smaller groups for English and computer classes, etc.

Only in 1992 the Lyceum became an independent school. In the same year  Viktoras Filipavičius became the principal. He continued the previous work and kept cherishing the free academic environment. Shortly Vilnius Lyceum sought to become a gymnasium. In 1994 when V. Filipavičius decided to retire, the council elected  Saulius Jurkevičius for the principal's position. In June 1995 Vilnius city council made a decision to give Lyceum the premises (Širvintų str. 82), this way the school gained its home and celebrated the 5th anniversary.

In 2004 Vilnius city council, having taken into account the school's request and the approval of the Ministry of education and science decided to rename Vilnius Lyceum of Exact, Natural and Technical Sciences to Vilnius Lyceum. The latter name remains until today.

Vilnius Lyceum Alumni association was founded in 2007. Now it unites all students who have graduated from this school. Vilnius Lyceum Alumni Association UK charity was established in 2019 to bring together benevolent activities of the alumni of Vilnius Lyceum based in the United Kingdom.

Vilnius Lyceum became an International Baccalaureate (IB) World School in May 1997.

Admission 

Competition for places at the Lyceum is high and admission is based entirely on student's academic merit, as measured by the admission examinations.

The admission exams to Grade 9 are as follows:

 Lithuanian language and literature (30 points)
 Mathematics (30 points)
 History (30 points)
 Biology (30 points)

The admission exams to the IB class are as follows:
 English language and literature (60 points)
 Mathematics (60 points)
 Students are given up to 10 extra points, which are calculated according to their academic results.

Rankings and reputation 
Vilnius Lyceum is regularly ranked within the top 2 high schools in Lithuania and is currently ranked first in Lithuania in the journal Reitingai.

Principals 
1990 Giedrius Zlatkus
1992 Viktoras Filipavičius
1994 Saulius Jurkevičius (current)

Notable alumni 
 Eglė Bilevičiūtė, a lawyer
 Laimonas Markauskas, a lawyer
 Vytis Jurkonis, a political analyst and a lecturer at Vilnius University
 Unė Kaunaitė, a writer, public figure and the Adviser to the Prime Minister on education, science and culture
 Ignas Krupavičius, a journalist and a television presenter
 Linas Kukuraitis, a politician, the Minister of Social Security and Labour
 Vaidotas Žala, rally and rally-raid champion
 Miglė Anušauskaitė, a writer and an artist
 Simas Čelutka, a political analyst, a writer and a lecturer at Vilnius University.

References 

Gymnasiums in Vilnius
Educational institutions established in 1990
International Baccalaureate schools in Lithuania
1990 establishments in Lithuania